Shaktiman was a Kathiwaari horse who served the Uttarakhand Police Force who died from wounds received on duty in 2016.

Incident
Shaktiman was attacked with a stick by BJP MLA Ganesh Joshi, later arrested, during a protest organized by BJP against the Chief Minister of Uttarakhand. In the melee, another man grabbed the horse by its bridle, unbalancing the horse, who fell and fractured a leg, shattering it completely. The incident created a huge uproar from citizens, celebrities and animal rights activists worldwide, though Joshi claimed the horse had been injured because its leg had gotten stuck in a pothole. Once the video of BJP MLA attacking Shaktiman was out in social media, experts across the world offered to help Shaktiman so that he could recover soon. Veterinarians in Dehradun, Uttarakhand treated Shaktiman and later his injured limb was amputated to save his life

Recovery and death
In the weeks following its amputation, Shaktiman learnt to walk using an American prosthetic leg. He was regularly administered ice packs and given physiotherapy every day. Days after he was fitted with a prosthetic leg, Shaktiman even briefly wandered out of his makeshift enclosure amid cheers and claps from the team that looked after him. It also lost 70 kg in the weeks after the incident.

Shaktiman died on 20 April 2016, after being sedated for a minor surgery. Uttarakhand Chief Minister Harish Rawat, was among those who visited its enclosure after its death.

References

Individual mares
Uttarakhand